The gudok, gudochek is an ancient Eastern Slavic string musical instrument, played with a bow.

A gudok usually had three strings, two of them tuned in unison and played as a drone, the third tuned a fifth higher. All three strings were in the same plane at the bridge, so that a bow could make them all sound simultaneously. Sometimes the gudok also had several sympathetic strings (up to eight) under the sounding board. These made the gudok's sound warm and rich.

The player held the gudok on his lap, like a cello or viola da gamba. It was also possible to play the gudok while standing and even while dancing, which made it popular among skomorokhs.  Initially in the 12th century (and probably before), the gudok did not have a neck for pressing strings.  This suggests that it was played by stopping the strings from the side with fingernails (similarly to the Byzantine lyra), rather than pressing strings onto the instrument's neck. Later in the 14th century some modifications of the gudok had a real neck for pressing strings.

Russian gudok ceased to exist as a folk instrument for several centuries. All present instruments are replicas, based on several parts of gudoks found in the Novgorod excavations.

There have been several attempts to revive the gudok in music. Borodin's opera Prince Igor, contains a "Gudok Player's Song", which is an artistic reconstruction of how the gudok may have sounded.

See also
Gadulka - a related Bulgarian instrument

References
Humeniuk, A. - Ukrainski narodni muzychni instrumenty - Kyiv: Naukova dumka, 1967
Mizynec, V. - Ukrainian Folk Instruments - Melbourne: Bayda books, 1984
Cherkaskyi, L. - Ukrainski narodni muzychni instrumenty // Tekhnika, Kyiv, Ukraine, 2003 - 262 pages. 
Povetkin, V. I.  - "Musical instruments" // Wood Use in Medieval Novgorod. Edited by Mark Brisbane and Jon Hather. Oxbow Books and the authors, 2007. р. 360-381: illustrated.
N.G. Gerasimova, M.I. Kolosova, K.M. Plotkin, V.I. Povetkin. - "Thirteenth century fiddles from excavations in Pskov. Their investigation, stabilization and reconstruction" // Proceedings of the 4-th IGOM Group on Wet Organic Archaeological Materials Conference. Bremerhaven, 1990. Edited by  Per Hoffmann Deutsches Schiffahrtsmuseum. P. 267-279: il.

External links

Site with large photo of 12th century gudok or rebec.

Necked bowl lutes
Bowed instruments
Ukrainian musical instruments
Russian musical instruments
Russian inventions
String instruments with sympathetic strings